Agustín Rangel (5 May 1925 – 30 October 2012) was a Venezuelan sports shooter. He competed at the 1964 Summer Olympics and the 1972 Summer Olympics.

References

External links
 

1925 births
2012 deaths
Venezuelan male sport shooters
Olympic shooters of Venezuela
Shooters at the 1964 Summer Olympics
Shooters at the 1972 Summer Olympics
Place of birth missing
Pan American Games medalists in shooting
Pan American Games bronze medalists for Venezuela
Shooters at the 1963 Pan American Games
20th-century Venezuelan people